Hot Country Songs is a chart that ranks the top-performing country music songs in the United States, published by Billboard magazine.  In 1965, 19 different singles topped the chart, which was published at the time under the title Hot Country Singles, in 52 issues of the magazine.  Chart placings were based on playlists submitted by country music radio stations and sales reports submitted by stores.

At the start of the year, Connie Smith was at number one with "Once a Day", the song's sixth week atop the chart, and remained at number one until the issue dated January 23, 1965, when it was displaced by "You're the Only World I Know" by Sonny James.  "Once a Day"s total of eight consecutive weeks at number one set a new record for the longest unbroken run by a solo female singer atop the Hot Country chart which stood until 2012 when Taylor Swift's "We Are Never Ever Getting Back Together" remained atop the chart for nine consecutive weeks.  Smith was the only solo female vocalist to appear at number one on the country listing in 1965; the only other female artist to reach the top spot during the year was Priscilla Mitchell, who topped the chart with "Yes, Mr. Peters", a duet with Roy Drusky.

Buck Owens, one of the most successful recording artists of the mid-1960s, spent the highest total number of weeks at number one in 1965 with thirteen.  He also had the most number ones of the year, taking four different singles to the top spot.  Three other artists achieved multiple number ones during the year, each topping the chart twice.  Eddy Arnold, one of the biggest country music stars of the 1940s and early 1950s, had revitalized his somewhat declining career by embracing the "Nashville sound", a newer style of country music which eschewed elements of the earlier honky-tonk style in favor of smooth productions which had a broader appeal.  In 1965 he gained two number ones, the first of which, "What's He Doing in My World", was his first chart-topper since 1955.  Jim Reeves also achieved two chart-toppers in 1965, both of which were posthumous; the singer had been killed in a plane crash the previous year.  Sonny James also topped the chart twice during the year.  Del Reeves, Warner Mack, Little Jimmy Dickens, and the duet pairing of Roy Drusky and Priscilla Mitchell all achieved their first career number ones in 1965.  Johnny Wright also reached number one for the first time as a solo artist; he had previously spent time at number one in 1954 as half of the duo Johnnie & Jack, but had been forced to go solo after his singing partner Jack Anglin was killed in a car crash in 1963.  Neither Wright nor any of the other acts to achieve a first career number one in 1965 would ever return to the top spot.

Chart history

See also
1965 in music
1965 in country music
List of artists who reached number one on the U.S. country chart

References

1965
Country
1965 record charts